KSTV-FM (93.1 FM, The Mighty 93) is a radio station broadcasting a country music format. Licensed to Dublin, Texas, United States, the station serves the Stephenville and Cross Timbers area. The station is currently owned by Robert Elliott, Jr., through licensee Villecom LLC, and features programming from Citadel Broadcasting.

References

External links
 
 

Country radio stations in the United States
STV-FM